The Copa Centroamericana (Spanish for "Central American Cup") was the main association football competition contested by the senior men's national teams of the members of the Unión Centroamericana de Fútbol (UNCAF), the sport's Central American governing body. Held every two years since 1991, in the years before and after the FIFA World Cup tournaments, it was originally called the UNCAF Nations Cup, changing to the latter name in 2011.

The tournament consisted of two stages. In the group round of the tournament finals, the seven teams competed in two round-robin groups, one of four teams and the other of three, for points, with the top two teams in each group proceeding. These four teams qualified for the semifinal stage of the final round, where the winners advanced into the final while the losers disputed a third-place match. The fifth-place match was disputed between the third-ranked teams of the group stage. Depending on their performance in the Copa Centroamericana, teams then went on to participate in other competitions, such as the CONCACAF Gold Cup and the Copa América.

The 14 Central American Championship tournaments were won by four different national teams: Costa Rica were the most successful national team of the competition with eight victories. Honduras won four titles. Guatemala and Panama won one title each. Costa Rica and Honduras were the only sides in history to win consecutive titles, with the former winning an unprecedented three titles in 2003, 2005 and 2007.

The final tournament was held in 2017, after which it was absorbed into the CONCACAF Nations League.

History
Due to the success of the Costa Rica national football team at the 1990 FIFA World Cup and the approaching 1994 FIFA World Cup to be hosted in the United States, the CONCACAF Congress in Kingston, Jamaica decided to stage a continental championship itself; the CONCACAF Gold Cup was ratified on August 18, 1990. Costa Rica were given a bye into the competition due to its first place placing at the 1989 CONCACAF Championship, which also served as a qualification phase for the World Cup hosted by Italy. However, due to mainly economic reasons, the United States were chosen as the venue for the continental tournament.

During that same conference, the qualification format for the Central American associations were also decided on. The final qualification round of the Central American zone had two bids: the United States and Costa Rica. Costa Rica, now three-time CONCACAF champions and to celebrate their anniversary of the nation's World Cup performance by its team, was named by CONCACAF and UNCAF as the host country of the inaugural UNCAF Nations Cup tournament on February 19, 1991.

Results

 Placings decided on a round-robin basis.

Teams reaching the top four

* Hosts

All-time Copa Centroamericana table

References

External links
  
  

 
Nations Cup
CONCACAF Gold Cup qualification
Defunct international association football competitions in North America
Recurring sporting events established in 1991
Recurring sporting events disestablished in 2017
1991 establishments in North America
2017 disestablishments in North America